Dihydroequilin may refer to:

 17α-Dihydroequilin
 17β-Dihydroequilin

See also
 Dihydroequilenin (disambiguation)